With You may refer to:

Music
 With You., an American house music group

Albums 
 With You (album), by Stacy Lattisaw, or the title song, 1981
 With You, by Josh Groban, 2007
 With You, by Natalie Walker, 2008
 With U (EP), by Big Bang, or the title song, 2008

Songs 
 "With You" (Charly McClain song), 1982
 "With You" (Chris Brown song), 2007
 "With You" (De Fam song), 2015
 "With You" (Demis Roussos song), 1974
 "With You" (Elevation Worship song), 2019
 "With You" (Irving Berlin song), 1929
 "With You" (Jay Sean song), 2019
 "With You" (Jessica Simpson song), 2003
 "With You" (Jimin song), 2022
 "With You" (Kaskade and Meghan Trainor song), 2019
 "With You" (Lila McCann song), 1999
 "With You" (Mariah Carey song), 2018
 "With You" (Matt Simons song), 2012
 "With You" (The Subways song), 2005
 "With You" (Tony Terry song), 1991
 "With U", 2006 song by Janet Jackson
 "With You", by Aly & AJ from Ten Years, 2017
 "With You", by Ashley Walters, 2009
 "With You", by Exo from Don't Mess Up My Tempo, 2018
 "With You", by Drake from Views, 2016
 "With You", by Gawvi from Panorama, 2018
 "With You", by Keith Urban from The Speed of Now Part 1, 2020
 "With You", by Kygo from Kids in Love, 2017
 "With You", by Lil Wayne from I Am Not a Human Being, 2010
 "With You", by Linkin Park from Hybrid Theory, 2000
 "With You", by LMFAO from Sorry for Party Rocking, 2011
 "With You", by the New Romantics, featuring Maia Lee, 2008
 "With You", by Prince from Prince, 1979
 "With You", by Red Velvet from Summer Magic, 2018

Television
 With You (Chinese TV series), a 2016 streaming teen drama series
 With You (Singaporean TV series), a 2010 drama series
 With You (South Korean TV series), a 2014–2017 reality show

See also